Whitey Ford Sings the Blues is the second solo studio album by American recording artist Everlast, and the first one following his departure from House of Pain. It was released on September 8, 1998, via Tommy Boy Records, a full eight years after his solo debut album Forever Everlasting and after he had a major heart attack.  "Whitey Ford" in the album title refers to the New York Yankees pitcher with that name.

The album was both a commercial and critical success (selling more than three million copies) and went 2× platinum according to RIAA. It peaked at No. 9 on the Billboard 200. Its hit single "What It's Like" became Everlast's most popular and successful song, which received him a Grammy Award nomination for Best Male Rock Vocal Performance at the 42nd Annual Grammy Awards.

Whitey Ford Sings the Blues blended rap with acoustic and electric guitars, developed by Everlast together with producers Dante Ross and John Gamble. The album primarily incorporates a mix of musical styles such as blues, rock and hip hop.

Singles 

Whitey Ford Sings the Blues spawned five singles: "What It's Like", "Painkillers", "Money (Dollar Bill)", "Ends", and "Today (Watch Me Shine)". Its lead single "What It's Like" peaked at No. 1 on the Billboard Hot Mainstream Rock Tracks and Hot Modern Rock Tracks. "Ends" peaked at No. 7 on the Billboard Alternative Songs, "Today (Watch Me Shine)" peaked at No. 12 on the Ö3 Austria Top 40, and the other two did not appear in main music charts. "Painkillers" appeared in the 1999 Jet Li film Black Mask.

Track listing 

Notes
 "The White Boy Is Back" is a cover song of "The Fat Boys Are Back" by Fat Boys, performed by Kia Jeffries
 "Ends" features background vocals by Bronx Style Bob
Samples
 "The White Boy Is Back" contains samples of "The Fat Boys Are Back" by Fat Boys (1985)
 "Money (Dollar Bill)" contains samples of "Go No Further" by Olympic Runners (1975) and "Money (Dollar Bill Y'all)" by Jimmy Spicer (1983)
 "Ends" contains samples of "Rebirth" by Gershon Kingsley (1970), "C.R.E.A.M." by Wu-Tang Clan (1993), and "Friends" by Whodini (1984)
 "What It's Like" contains samples of "Say It Loud, I'm Black and I'm Proud" by James Brown (1968)
 "Get Down" contains samples of "Bumpin' Bus Stop" by Thunder and Lightning (1974) and "Impeach the President" by the Honey Drippers (1973)
 "Tired" contains samples of "Kool Is Back" by Funk, Inc. (1971)
 "Painkillers" contains samples of "Until It's Time for You to Go" by Grover Washington Jr. (1971)
 "Praise the Lord" contains samples of "DWYCK" by Gang Starr & Nice & Smooth (1992)
 "Today (Watch Me Shine)" contains samples of "Everybody Loves the Sunshine" by Roy Ayers Ubiquity (1976)
 "Death Comes Callin'" contains samples of "Gotta Learn How to Dance" by the Fatback Band (1975), "Funky Drummer" by James Brown (1970), "Change the Beat (Female Version)" by Beside (1982)
 "Funky Beat" contains samples of "Beat Bop" by Rammellzee & K-Rob (1983)
 "7 Years" contains samples of "Hard to Handle" by Otis Redding (1968) and "Spoonin' Rap" by Spoonie Gee (1979)
 "Next Man" contains samples of "Tropical Scene" by The Jonny Teupen Group (1977)

Personnel 
Adapted from Discogs

Vocalists

 Eric Francis Schrody – vocals (tracks 2–5, 7–9, 11–12, 14–18)
 Derek Murphy – vocals (track 2, 15)
 Bob Khaleel – vocals (track 12), backing vocals (track 3)
 Jon Owens – vocals (track 15)
 Kia Jeffries – vocals (track 1)
 Senen Reyes – voice (track 6)
 Paul Edward Huston – voice (track 10)
 Keith Edward Elam – voice (track 13)

Instrumentalists

 Eric Francis Schrody – guitar (track 3–4, 14, 17), scratches (track 5, 12), keyboards (track 14)
 Dante Ross – drum programming & scratches (track 15); piano, bass & strings (track 16)
 Keith "Keefus" Ciancia – keyboards (track 1, 5, 17)
 Nightrain Merlot – bass (track 3, 8, 12)
 Giovanni Loria – string arrangement (track 4), bass (track 5, 17)
 Ben Bocardo – bass (track 4)
 Elizabeth Wright – cello (track 4)
 Stephan Cullo – keyboards (track 4)
 John Wang – viola (track 4)
 Alen C. Agadhzhanyan – first violin (track 4)
 Jacqueline Suzuki – second violin (track 4)
 Darren Robinson – guitar (track 12)
 John Norwood Fisher – bass (track 14)
 Melvin Babu – scratches (track 14)
 DJ Daz – scratches (track 14)
 John Gamble – bass (track 15)
 Geoff Gallegos – tenor saxophone (track 17)
 Dan Osterman – trombone (track 17)
 Todd M. Simon – trumpet (track 17)

Technicals

 John Gamble – producer (tracks 1–7, 10, 12–18), mixing (track 3–5, 7, 9, 12, 14–18), engineer (tracks 1–5, 7–8, 11–12, 14–18)
 Dante Ross – producer (tracks 1–7, 10, 12–18), mixing (track 3–5, 7, 12, 14–17), executive producer
 Jamie Staub – mixing (tracks 3–5, 8, 11–12, 14–15, 17)
 Mark Richardson – producer & mixing (track 8)
 Eric Brooks – producer & mixing (track 11)
 Siba Giba – producer (track 9)
 Eric Francis Schrody – executive producer
 Carl Stubner – executive producer

Additional

 Dante Ross – A&R direction
 Max Nichols – A&R direction
 Jason Rand – art direction, design
 Keith Carter – photography

Charts

Weekly charts

Year-end charts

Certifications

References 

1998 albums
Everlast (musician) albums
Tommy Boy Records albums
Albums produced by Dante Ross
Albums produced by John Gamble (record producer)